Washington County High School, or WCHS, is a 2A high school in Chatom, Alabama. The campus is also the site of Chatom Middle School, which is grades 5-8. It is the largest school in Washington County, with 184 students enrolled in the high school as of 2018. The mascot is a bulldog, Butch. Beginning with the 2012-2013 school year, dual enrollment classes were introduced to Juniors and Seniors in the high school. School colors are maroon and gold.  The marching band is known as "The Pride of the Deep South". The football program at Washington County High School has peaked during the 2012-2013 and 2013-2014 seasons with two consecutive appearances in the AHSAA Super 6 against the Tanner Rattlers. Both times WCHS returned as state runners-up.

Sports

Football
2-time 2A State Runner-Up (2012 & 2013).

Varsity and JV programs for students grades 7-12.

Volleyball
State Finalist (2016) Substate finalist (2009) and 2nd Round Regional finalist (2015)(2019)

Varsity and JV teams for girls grades 7-12.

Women's Basketball
State tournament semi-finalist (1988, 2007)

Regional Finals (2007 & 2010)

Junior High, JV and Varsity teams for girls grades 7-12.

Men's Basketball
Junior High, JV and Varsity teams for boys grades 7-12.

Softball
Regional Tournament (2015-2017)

JV and Varsity teams for girls grades 7-12.

Baseball
3A State Runner-Up (2007)

JV and Varsity teams for boys grades 7-12.

Golf
Golf team for students grades 7-12

Track and Field (Outdoor)
Track team that regularly qualifies for the state meet for students grades 8-12.

Soccer(Co-ed)
Soccer began their first season in 2018

Clubs and Organizations

Cheerleaders
Varsity, grades 9-12, and JV, grades 7-8, cheer-leading squads as well as the school mascot 'Butch.'

Marching Band
Known as "The Pride of the Deep South", this is a Best in Class (2015-2021) award-winning, a superior-rated band composed of students in grades 7-12. It is made up of wind instruments, percussion, and auxiliaries.

In 2018, they received all 1's in Little Big Horn in Opp, Alabama. They also won Best in Class in Percussion and Dance Line.

In 2019, the band received all 1's in Little Big Horn in Opp, Alabama. The Band won Best in Class in Drum Major, Dance Line, Percussion, Color Guard, and Overall Band. This is their fifth consecutive year receiving all 1's.

In 2020, the band participated in an online marching competition hosted by J.U. Blacksher High School. They received 1's in everything except Color Guard. The band won Best in Class Overall Band, Percussion, and Danceline.

Gold Duster Dance Team
Two-time Alabama Dance Champions (2000, 2001)

Award-winning dance team that is made up of young ladies in grades 8-12.

Colorguard
Award-winning flag corp composed of girls in grades 7-12.

Maroon Magic Dance Team
JV dance team for girls grades 5-7.

Student Council
Student government positions for grades 10-12, whose main objective every year is to create a memorable homecoming.

National Honor Society
The National Honor Society is an organization for Seniors who are selected by their superior academic status and panel evaluation.

Future Farmers of America (FFA)
The Future Farmers of America is an organization that competes at the district and state level made up of high school students.

Choir
Singers who perform at band concerts and the Veteran's Day program.

The Washtonian Yearbook Staff
Group of high school students who create the yearbook every year.

National Junior Honor Society
The National Junior Honor Society is an organization for 8th graders who are selected by their superior academic status.

Drama Club
Theater group for middle school students who put on one play every year.

Betty Dees retired in 2017 and the Drama Club has not since put on a play.

Scholars Bowl Team
In 2018 the high school received a Scholars Bowl Team. They go to a Scholars Bowl tournament every at Coastal Alabama Community College Monroeville

Academics
In 2012 WCHS began a new, in house, dual enrollment system for juniors and seniors who wished to take part in it. Partnering with the University of West Alabama, these students were able to receive high school and college credits in classes such as English 101 and 102, Speech 101 and then eventually American literature classes. WCHS became the first school in its school system to offer such a program. This dual enrollment program still exists today as WCHS now works with Coastal Alabama Community College.

Notable alumni
 Rusty Jackson, former NFL punter

References 

Public high schools in Alabama
Educational institutions established in 1915
Schools in Washington County, Alabama
Public middle schools in Alabama
1915 establishments in Alabama